Yasser Quesada Pérez (born 1992) is a Cuban chess player. He was awarded the title of Grandmaster (GM) by FIDE in 2017, the 27th player from Cuba to earn the title. He won the 2022 Cuban Chess Championship.

He has qualified to play in the Chess World Cup 2021.

Family
His older brother, Yuniesky Quesada, is also a Grandmaster.

References

External links 
 
 Yasser Quesada Pérez chess games at 365Chess.com
 

1992 births
Living people
Chess grandmasters
Cuban chess players